There are 67 National Historic Landmarks within Philadelphia, Pennsylvania.
See also the List of National Historic Landmarks in Pennsylvania, which covers the 102 landmarks in the rest of the state.

Current listings

|}

See also

 National Register of Historic Places listings in Philadelphia, Pennsylvania
 List of Pennsylvania state historical markers in Philadelphia County

References

 
 
Pennsylvania